The 2023 PokerGO Tour was the third season of the PokerGO Tour. The season runs for 2023 with the first event beginning on January 11.

During the 2021 season, the top three finishers were awarded prize money, while in the 2022 season, there was a winner-take-all PGT Championship. For the 2023 season, the top 40 players and "Dream Seat" winners will compete in the season-ending PGT Championship once all qualifying PokerGO Tour tournaments have concluded.

Leaderboard 
The top 40 players following the conclusion of all qualifying PokerGO Tour tournaments for 2023 will be invited to play in the season-ending PGT Championship. In addition to the top 40 players on the PGT leaderboard, there will be a select group of "Dream Seat" winners awarded via special events and promotions to grant players exclusive entry into the PGT Championship. Players will have their starting chips based on how many points they earned during the season with the minimum starting chips being 100 big blinds for all players and Dream Seat winners.

The PGT Championship will be a $1,000,000 freeroll for 2023 with a $500,000 first-place prize and final table payouts.

The leaderboard is published on the PokerGO Tour website.

Note: Leaderboard is correct as of February 17, 2023.

Schedule 
The full schedule and results for the 2023 PokerGO Tour is published on the website.

(#/#): The first number is the number of PokerGO Tour titles won in 2023. The second number is the total number of PokerGO Tour titles won. Both numbers represent totals as of that point on the PokerGO Tour.

References 

Poker tournaments